Pacific Basin Shipping Limited is a maritime transport company engaged in international dry bulk shipping through the operation of a fleet of vessels to carry diverse cargoes for many of the world's leading commodity groups. Pacific Basin operates a fleet of Handysize and Supramax vessels globally.

History 
Pacific Basin was first founded as Pacific Basin Bulk Shipping Limited, a bulk carrier operator, in 1987, but it was acquired and privatized by an independent company in 1996. However, the former senior management reestablished the company as Pacific Basin Shipping Limited in 1998. Pacific Basin Shipping Limited was listed on the Hong Kong Stock Exchange in 2004.

Bass Strait 
Pacific Basin is the owner and operator of Bass Strait, a cargo ship that launched a series of drones that surveilled and harassed United States Navy ships, including the USS Paul Hamilton, in waters off of Southern California in 2019, according to documents released to The Drive under the Freedom of Information Act.

References

External links 

 

Companies listed on the Hong Kong Stock Exchange
Transport companies established in 1998
Shipping companies of Hong Kong